Rossetti and His Circle is a book of twenty-three caricatures by English caricaturist, essayist and parodist Max Beerbohm. Published in 1922 by William Heinemann, the drawings were Beerbohm's humorous imaginings concerning the life of Dante Gabriel Rossetti and his fellow Pre-Raphaelites, the period, as he put it, "just before oneself." The book is now considered one of Beerbohm's masterpieces.

Beerbohm and Rossetti

Beerbohm returned to England from his home in Rapallo in Italy so that he could study photographs of the subjects he depicted in his caricatures. During the winter of 1917 he rented a cottage in the English countryside near the home of his friend William Rothenstein so that he could work on his Rossetti drawings. Every day, carrying his portfolio of drawings with him, Beerbohm walked across the snow to visit Rothenstein. "No wonder Max was nervous of leaving his Rossetti caricatures in an empty cottage... What a remarkable reconstruction of a period!" Rothenstein later wrote.
Rossetti and the Pre-Raphaelite Brotherhood had captured Beerbohm's imagination. "In London, in the great days of a deep, smug, thick, rich, drab, industrial complacency," he wrote, "Rossetti shone, for the men and women who knew him, with the ambiguous light of a red torch somewhere in a dense fog. And so he still shines for me."

Beerbohm's caricatures include Dante Gabriel Rossetti with his sister Christina, John Ruskin, Algernon Charles Swinburne, William Holman Hunt, John Millais and George Meredith. In plate 22, Oscar Wilde, on his 1882 lecture tour in America, describes the delights of the Aesthetic Movement to a fascinated audience. This tour had been organised by Richard D'Oyly Carte to publicise the new Gilbert and Sullivan opera Patience.

Sir Hugh Walpole bequeathed Beerbohm's original watercolour artwork for Rossetti and His Circle to the Tate Collection in London in 1941.

A special limited edition of 380 numbered copies bound in white cloth was also published in 1922. These were signed by Beerbohm.

Contents
 Note (Beerbohm's Introduction to the Caricatures)
 Frontispiece: Rossetti in Childhood. 
 1. British Stock and Alien Inspiration. 
 2. Rossetti's Courtship. 
 3. A Momentary Vision that once Befell Young Millais. 
 4. A Remark by Benjamin Jowett. 
 5. Coventry Patmore at Spring Cottage. 
 6. Ned Jones and Topsy. 
 7. John Ruskin meets Miss Cornforth. 
 8. Blue China. 
 9. Woolner at Farringford. 
 10. Ford Madox Brown patronised by Holman Hunt. 
 11. The Small Hours in the Sixties at 16, Cheyne Walk. 
 12. Gabriel and Christina. 
 13. George Meredith's Hortation. 
 14. William Bell Scott Wondering. 
 15. Robert Browning introduces a Great Lady. 
 16. George Augustus Sala with Rossetti. 
 17. Swinburne and Mr. Gosse. 
 18. Mr. Morley brings Mr. Mill. 
 19. Mr. Leighton suggests Candidature. 
 20. Mr. Watts, Mr. Shields, and Mr. Caine. 
 21. The Touch of a Vanished Hand. 
 22. Rossetti's Name is heard in America.

The Plates

See also
Caricatures of Twenty-five Gentlemen (1896)
The Poets' Corner (1904)
Fifty Caricatures (1913)

References

External links
Rossetti and His Circle on Victorianweb.org
The Beerbohm Collection at the Tate
Turning the pages of Rossetti and His Circle

1922 books
Works by Max Beerbohm
Pre-Raphaelite Brotherhood
Caricature
Heinemann (publisher) books
Books about artists
Parodies of paintings